Xyletobius lineatus is a species of beetle in the family Ptinidae.

Subspecies
These four subspecies belong to the species Xyletobius lineatus:
 Xyletobius lineatus apicalis Perkins, 1910
 Xyletobius lineatus holomelas Perkins, 1910
 Xyletobius lineatus humeralis Perkins, 1910
 Xyletobius lineatus lineatus Sharp, 1885

References

Further reading

 
 
 
 

Ptinidae
Beetles described in 1885